Bruno Orešar (born 21 April 1967) is a Croatian businessman and former professional tennis player who competed for Yugoslavia.

Tennis career
Orešar had a highly successful junior tennis career. He is a three-time winner of Orange Bowl, his third win coming after beating the then-16-year-old Boris Becker in the final. At one time he was the number one ranked junior in the world.

Orešar's senior career was less successful. Apart from winning two gold medals in the 1987 Summer Universiade (in singles and in mixed doubles with Sabrina Goleš), his biggest singles tournament successes were reaching the finals of Athens and Båstad in 1988 and 1989 respectively. A persistent back injury forced him into early retirement from professional tennis in 1991. His highest ATP ranking was #46 in May 1989.

In the early 1990s Orešar took part in founding the Croatian Tennis Association and coached the Croatian national tennis team. In 1995 he bought Jadrankamen, a Brač-based quarrying company, and expanded further into construction and tourism. In 2005 he made the list of 1000 most powerful people in Croatia, compiled by Nacional weekly.

Career finals

Singles (2 runners-up)

Doubles (1 runner-up)

References

External links
 
 
 

1967 births
Living people
Croatian businesspeople
Croatian male tennis players
Tennis players from Zagreb
Yugoslav male tennis players
Universiade medalists in tennis
Universiade gold medalists for Yugoslavia
Medalists at the 1987 Summer Universiade